Stéphane Sarni (born 31 August 1980) is a Swiss-Italian former professional footballer who played as defender.

In 2009 he came on as a substitute and scored one of Sion's goals as they defeated BSC Young Boys 3-2 in the Swiss Cup Final.

Honours 
Sion
Swiss Cup: 2005–06, 2008–09

References

External links

1980 births
Living people
Swiss people of Italian descent
Association football defenders
Italian footballers
FC Sion players
Servette FC players
AC Bellinzona players
FC Stade Nyonnais players
FC Lugano players
FC Monthey players
FC Martigny-Sports players
Swiss Super League players
FC Sion non-playing staff